The Dr. George R. Christie House is a historic house museum in Long Prairie, Minnesota, United States.  It was built in 1901 as the family home and office of Dr. George R. Christie (1858–1947), the first licensed physician in Todd County.  After housing two generations of the Christie family, the building and its original furnishings were donated to the city of Long Prairie in 1976 to serve as a public museum.  The house was listed on the National Register of Historic Places in 2006 for having local significance in the theme of health/medicine.  It was nominated for illustrating the social and economic stature afforded to doctors in small-town Minnesota.

See also
 List of museums in Minnesota
 National Register of Historic Places listings in Todd County, Minnesota

References

External links

 Christie Home Historical Society

1901 establishments in Minnesota
Buildings and structures in Todd County, Minnesota
Historic house museums in Minnesota
Houses completed in 1901
Houses on the National Register of Historic Places in Minnesota
Museums established in 1976
National Register of Historic Places in Todd County, Minnesota
Neoclassical architecture in Minnesota